Bechmann is a surname. Notable people with the surname include:

Christoph Bechmann (born 1971), German field hockey player
Lucien Bechmann (1880–1968), French architect
Tommy Bechmann (born 1981), Danish footballer

See also
5024 Bechmann, outer main-belt asteroid